Jask (Balochi: جاشک also Romanized as Jāsk; also Bandar-e Jask, (Balochi: بندن ءِ جاشک) also Romanized as Bandar-e Jāsk) is a city and capital of Jask County, Hormozgan Province, Iran. At the 2006 census, its population was 11,133, in 2,406 families.

situated on the Gulf of Oman. 
It serves as the capital of Jask County, and is the site of a base of the Iranian Navy which opened on October 28, 2008.
The base's position provides the Iranian Navy with the capability to close the Strait of Hormuz in order to block the entry of an "enemy" into the Persian Gulf. Admiral Habibollah Sayyari remarked on the base's opening that Iran was "creating a new defense front in the region, thinking of a non-regional enemy."

The port of Jask is also the proposed end of the Neka-Jask pipeline. The city also has the Jask Airport.

Port of Jask 

The port of Jask is a small port on the western part of Iran's coast along the Gulf of Oman. However, over the last few years it has seen a steady growth of its export freight flows to Oman, mostly agricultural products, including refrigerated, and construction materials

Major developments for the port of Jask were announced by Iranian authorities in early 2019, i.e. the construction of a new terminal for oil tankers for a total investment of US$700 million, to be followed by the construction of a refinery and of a petrochemical plant. These developments are part of a total investment of US$1.8 billion centered on the construction of a new oil pipeline from Goreh, Bushehr to Jask in order to pump and export oil from Northern Iran.

When these investments are completed in Jask, they will contribute to developing Iran's southern regional economy, as is already the case further east at Chabahar Port, and to facilitating exports through ports which do not require ships to enter the Persian Gulf through the Hormuz Strait.

Language 
The linguistic composition of the city:

Climate
Jask has a hot desert climate (Köppen climate classification BWh), with very hot summers, warm winters and little precipitation. Due to winds blowing off the Persian Gulf and Gulf of Oman, the city has experienced some of the highest dew points and heat indices in the world.

See also

References

External links
 

Cities in Hormozgan Province
Populated places in Jask County
Port cities and towns in Iran